Jupiaba is a genus of characins from South America. with 27 currently described species:
 Jupiaba abramoides (C. H. Eigenmann, 1909)
 Jupiaba acanthogaster (C. H. Eigenmann, 1911)
 Jupiaba anteroides (Géry, 1965)
 Jupiaba apenima Zanata, 1997
 Jupiaba asymmetrica (C. H. Eigenmann, 1908)
 Jupiaba atypindi Zanata, 1997
 Jupiaba citrina Zanata & Ohara, 2009
 Jupiaba elassonaktis T. N. A. Pereira & Lucinda, 2007
 Jupiaba essequibensis (C. H. Eigenmann, 1909)
 Jupiaba iasy Netto-Ferreira, Zanata, Birindelli & Sousa, 2009
 Jupiaba keithi (Géry, Planquette & Le Bail, 1996)
 Jupiaba kurua Birindelli, Zanata, Sousa & Netto-Ferreira, 2009
 Jupiaba maroniensis (Géry, Planquette & Le Bail, 1996)
 Jupiaba meunieri (Géry, Planquette & Le Bail, 1996)
 Jupiaba minor (Travassos, 1964)
 Jupiaba mucronata (C. H. Eigenmann, 1909)
 Jupiaba ocellata (Géry, Planquette & Le Bail, 1996)
 Jupiaba paranatinga Netto-Ferreira, Zanata, Birindelli & Sousa, 2009
 Jupiaba pinnata (C. H. Eigenmann, 1909)
 Jupiaba pirana Zanata, 1997
 Jupiaba poekotero Zanata & F. C. T. Lima, 2005
 Jupiaba polylepis (Günther, 1864)
 Jupiaba poranga Zanata, 1997
 Jupiaba potaroensis (C. H. Eigenmann, 1909)
 Jupiaba scologaster (M. J. Weitzman & Vari, 1986)
 Jupiaba yarina Zanata, 1997
 Jupiaba zonata (C. H. Eigenmann, 1908)

References
 

Characidae
Taxa named by Angela Maria Zanata
Fish of South America